Omar Akram is an Afghan-American producer, composer, and pianist. In 2013, he became the first Afghan-American to win a Grammy Award for Best New Age Album for his fourth studio album, Echoes of Love. He is also an inspirational writer who contributes to The Huffington Post.

Early life
Akram was born in New York City. He grew up traveling around the world as the son of a United Nations diplomat living everywhere from Prague to Havana as well as his ancestral home of Afghanistan. He notably met Fidel Castro at the age of 14, who is said to have allowed him to sneak into the local Cuban jazz clubs, the sounds of which influenced his formative compositional style.

Career

In 1993, Akram moved to Los Angeles where he performed in various Mainstream Top 40 bands while also writing his own music.

In 2002, he signed a recording deal with Real Music. His first commercial album release that same year, titled Opal Fire, reached Billboard's New Age Top 15 Chart that same year. His sophomore release Free As A Bird in 2004, produced and arranged by keyboardist Gregg Karukas, featured world class violinist Charlie Bisharat and Grammy Award-winning saxophonist Eric Marienthal. This album also reached Billboards New Age Top 15 Chart that same year. In 2007, Secret Journey, produced, co-written and arranged by Gregg Karukas, also critically acclaimed, featured Ardeshir Farah. In 2012, Akram was nominated and won the Grammy Award for Best New Age Album for his album Echoes of Love, also produced, co-written and arranged by Gregg Karukas. This album was followed by Daytime Dreamer in 2013 which featured six new recordings along with tracks previously released from Opal Fire and Free As A Bird.

Akram's most recent album release "Destiny," co-produced with producer Walter Afanasieff, was independently released through his own company, Twinbrook Entertainment, on August 9, 2019. Afanasieff also contributes vocals to the first single release from the album, "Here I Am".  An accompanying official music video was directed by Erik White. Shardad Rohani arranged and conducted the Slovak Radio Symphony Orchestra on two tracks. The album was mixed by four-time Grammy winner Dave Reitzas at Westlake Studios in Hollywood, CA.

Starting from the lockdown resulting from COVID-19 pandemic, Omar Akram has been producing a docu-series titled "Omar's Music Chamber, where he performed a number of songs in his previous albums, as well as some newly written music. " From this collection, Omar Akram released a new album, The Light Will Come, on April 23, 2021.

Awards and honors
Grammy Award for Best New Age Album for Echoes of Love in 2014.

Personal life
Omar currently resides in Los Angeles, California with his wife, son and daughter.

Discography

Opal Fire
Real Music
(Album Release Date: September 3, 2002)

Free As A Bird
Real Music
(Album Release Date: April 27, 2004)

Secret Journey
Real Music
(Album Release Date: September 25, 2007). Secret Journey peaked at #12 on Billboard's New Age Chart.

Echoes Of Love
Real Music
(Album Release Date: June 5, 2012). Echoes Of Love was awarded a Grammy for Best New Age Album.

Daytime Dreamer
Real Music
(Album Release Date: September 24, 2013)

Destiny
Twinbrook Entertainment
(Album Release Date: August 9, 2019)

The Light Will Come
Twinbrook Entertainment
(Album Release Date: April 23, 2021)

The second track of the album, For George, is dedicated to the memory of George Floyd.

References 

Living people
Afghan musicians
Grammy Award winners
1964 births